Major-General Charles Alexander Ramsay  (12 October 1936 – 31 December 2017) was a British Army officer.

Personal life
He married, in 1967, Mary MacAndrew with whom he had four children.

Military career
Ramsay was born the second son of Admiral Sir Bertram Ramsay. Educated at Eton College and the Royal Military Academy Sandhurst, he saw operational service as a squadron commander in Northern Ireland during The Troubles and went on to be commanding officer of the Royal Scots Dragoon Guards. After that he became Commander of Task Force Delta in 1980, Deputy Director of Military Operations in 1983 and General Officer Commanding Eastern District in 1984. His last appointment was as Director of the Territorial Army and Organisation at the Ministry of Defence in 1987 before retiring in 1989.

He was a member of the Queen's Body Guard for Scotland.

References

External links

 

1936 births
2017 deaths
People educated at Eton College
Graduates of the Royal Military Academy Sandhurst
British Army generals
Royal Scots Dragoon Guards officers
Officers of the Order of the British Empire
Companions of the Order of the Bath
British military personnel of The Troubles (Northern Ireland)
Members of the Royal Company of Archers